Spinosaurus is a genus of spinosaurid dinosaur that lived in what now is North Africa during the Cenomanian to upper Turonian stages of the Late Cretaceous period, about 99 to 93.5 million years ago. The genus was known first from Egyptian remains discovered in 1912 and described by German palaeontologist Ernst Stromer in 1915. The original remains were destroyed in World War II, but additional material came to light in the early 21st century. It is unclear whether one or two species are represented in the fossils reported in the scientific literature. The best known species is S. aegyptiacus from Egypt, although a potential second species, S. maroccanus, has been recovered from Morocco. The contemporary spinosaurid genus Sigilmassasaurus has also been synonymized by some authors with S. aegyptiacus, though other researchers propose it to be a distinct taxon. Another possible junior synonym is Oxalaia from the Alcântara Formation in Brazil.

Spinosaurus is the longest known terrestrial carnivore; other large carnivores comparable to Spinosaurus include theropods such as Tyrannosaurus, Giganotosaurus and Carcharodontosaurus. The skull of Spinosaurus was long, low, and narrow, similar to that of a modern crocodilian, and bore straight conical teeth with no serrations. It would have had large, robust forelimbs bearing three-fingered hands, with an enlarged claw on the first digit. The hip bones of Spinosaurus were reduced, and the legs were very short in proportion to the body. Its long and narrow tail was deepened by tall, thin neural spines and elongated chevrons, forming a flexible fin or paddle-like structure.

Spinosaurus is known to have eaten fish, and most scientists believe that it hunted both terrestrial and aquatic prey. Evidence suggests that it was highly semiaquatic, and lived both on land and in water much like modern crocodilians do. Spinosaurus's leg bones had osteosclerosis (high bone density), allowing for better buoyancy control, and the paddle-like tail was likely used for underwater propulsion. Multiple functions have been put forward for the dorsal sail, including thermoregulation and display; either to intimidate rivals or attract mates. It lived in a humid environment of tidal flats and mangrove forests alongside many other dinosaurs, as well as fish, crocodylomorphs, lizards, turtles, pterosaurs, and plesiosaurs.

Discovery and naming

Naming of species

Two species of Spinosaurus have been named: Spinosaurus aegyptiacus (meaning "Egyptian spine lizard") and the disputed Spinosaurus maroccanus (meaning "Moroccan spine lizard"). The first described remains of Spinosaurus were found and described in the early 20th century. In 1912, Richard Markgraf discovered a partial skeleton of a giant theropod dinosaur in the Bahariya Formation of western Egypt. In 1915, German paleontologist Ernst Stromer published an article assigning the specimen to a new genus and species, Spinosaurus aegyptiacus.

Fragmentary additional remains from Bahariya, including vertebrae and hindlimb bones, were designated by Stromer as "Spinosaurus B" in 1934. Stromer considered them different enough to belong to another species, and this has been borne out. With the advantage of more expeditions and material, it appears that they pertain either to Carcharodontosaurus or to Sigilmassasaurus.

S. maroccanus was originally described by Dale Russell in 1996 as a new species based on the length of its neck vertebrae. Specifically, Russell claimed that the ratio of the length of the centrum (body of vertebra) to the height of the posterior articular facet was 1.1 in S. aegyptiacus and 1.5 in S. maroccanus. Later authors have been split on this topic. Some authors note that the length of the vertebrae can vary from individual to individual, that the holotype specimen was destroyed and thus cannot be compared directly with the S. maroccanus specimen, and that it is unknown which cervical vertebrae the S. maroccanus specimens represent. Therefore, though some have retained the species as valid without much comment, most researchers regard S. maroccanus as a nomen dubium (dubious name) or as a junior synonym of S. aegyptiacus.

Specimens

Six main partial specimens of Spinosaurus have been described. BSP 1912 VIII 19, described by Stromer in 1915 from the Bahariya Formation, was the holotype. Stromer claimed that the specimen was from the early Cenomanian, about 97 million years ago.

It was destroyed in World War II, specifically "during the night of 24/25 April 1944 in a British bombing raid of Munich" that severely damaged the building housing the Paläontologisches Museum München (Bavarian State Collection of Paleontology). However, detailed drawings and descriptions of the specimen remain. Stromer's son donated Stromer's archives to the Paläontologische Staatssammlung München in 1995, and Smith and colleagues analysed two photographs of the Spinosaurus holotype specimen BSP 1912 VIII 19 discovered in the archives in 2000. On the basis of a photograph of the lower jaw and a photograph of the entire specimen as mounted, Smith concluded that Stromer's original 1915 drawings were slightly inaccurate.  In 2003, Oliver Rauhut suggested that Stromer's Spinosaurus holotype was a chimera, composed of vertebrae and neural spines from a carcharodontosaurid similar to Acrocanthosaurus and a dentary from Baryonyx or Suchomimus. The analysis was rejected in at least one subsequent paper.

It is the holotype of Spinosaurus maroccanus, as described by Russell in 1996. Other specimens referred to S. maroccanus in the same paper were two other mid-cervical vertebrae (NMC 41768 and NMC 50790), an anterior dentary fragment (NMC 50832), a mid-dentary fragment (NMC 50833), and an anterior dorsal neural arch (NMC 50813). Russell stated that "only general locality information could be provided" for the specimen, and therefore it could be dated only "possibly" to the Albian.

MNHN SAM 124, housed at the Muséum National d'Histoire Naturelle, is a snout (consisting of partial premaxillae, partial maxillae, vomers, and a dentary fragment). The specimen was located in Algeria, and "is of Albian age." Taquet and Russell believed that the specimen, along with a premaxilla fragment (SAM 125), two cervical vertebrae (SAM 126–127), and a dorsal neural arch (SAM 128), belonged to S. maroccanus.

BM231 (in the collection of the Office National des Mines, Tunis) was described by Buffetaut and Ouaja in 2002. It consists of a partial anterior dentary  in length from an early Albian stratum of the Chenini Formation of Tunisia. The dentary fragment, which included four alveoli and two partial teeth, was "extremely similar" to existing material of S. aegyptiacus.

UCPC-2 in the University of Chicago Paleontological Collection consists mainly of two narrow connected nasals with a fluted (ridged) crest from the region between the eyes.

Like UCPC-2, it is thought to have come from the early Cenomanian. Arden and colleagues in 2018 tentatively assigned this specimen to Sigilmassasaurus brevicollis given its size. However, this assignment was later rejected by other researchers who considered the uniqueness of this specimen to be based on misinterpretations and poor preservation of another specimen, NHMUK R16665, another snout stored that is stored in the Natural History Museum, London.

FSAC-KK 11888 is a partial subadult skeleton recovered from the Kem Kem beds of North Africa. Described by Ibrahim and colleagues (2014) and designated as the neotype specimen (although Evers and colleagues 2015 reject the neotype designation for FSAC-KK-11888). It includes cervical vertebrae, dorsal vertebrae, neural spines, a complete sacrum, femora, tibiae, pedal phalanges, caudal vertebra, several dorsal ribs, and fragments of the skull. The body proportions of the specimen have been debated, as the hind limbs are disproportionately shorter in the specimen than in previous reconstructions. However, it has been demonstrated by multiple paleontologists that the specimen is not a chimera, and is indeed a specimen of Spinosaurus that suggests that the animal had much smaller hind limbs than previously thought.

Other known specimens consist mainly of very fragmentary remains and scattered teeth. These include:

A 1986 paper described prismatic structures in tooth enamel from two Spinosaurus teeth from Tunisia.
 Buffetaut (1989, 1992) referred three specimens from the Institut und Museum für Geologie und Paläontologie of the University of Göttingen in Germany to Spinosaurus: a right maxilla fragment IMGP 969-1, a jaw fragment IMGP 969-2, and a tooth IMGP 969-3. These had been found in a Lower Cenomanian or Upper Albian deposit in southeastern Morocco in 1971.
Kellner and Mader (1997) described two unserrated spinosaurid teeth from Morocco (LINHM 001 and 002) that were "highly similar" to the teeth of the S. aegyptiacus holotype.
Teeth from the Chenini Formation in Tunisia which are "narrow, somewhat rounded in cross-section, and lack the anterior and posterior serrated edges characteristic of theropods and basal archosaurs" were assigned to Spinosaurus in 2000.
Teeth from the Echkar Formation of Niger were tentatively referred to Spinosaurus in 2007.

MHNM.KK374 to .KK378 are five isolated quadrates (skull bones) of different sizes that were collected by locals and acquired commercially in
the Kem Kem region of southeastern Morocco, provided by François Escuillié and are deposited in the collections of the Muséum d’Histoire Naturelle of Marrakech. The quadrates show two different morphologies, suggesting the existence of two spinosaurines in Morocco. However, a 2020 study on variation within Spinosaurus considers these differences in morphology to be indicative of variation in skull morphology within a single species, as is the case in Allosaurus.

Possible specimens

Material possibly belonging to Spinosaurus has been reported from the Turkana Grits of Kenya.

Some scientists have considered the genus Sigilmassasaurus a junior synonym of Spinosaurus. In Ibrahim and colleagues (2014), the specimens of Sigilmassasaurus was referred to Spinosaurus aegyptiacus together with "Spinosaurus B" as the neotype and Spinosaurus maroccanus was considered as a nomen dubium following the conclusions of the other papers. A 2015 re-description of Sigilmassasaurus disputed these conclusions, and considered the genus valid. This conclusion was further supported in 2018 by Arden and colleagues, who consider Sigilmassasaurus to be a distinct genus, though a very close relative of Spinosaurus, the two unified in the tribe Spinosaurini, coined in the study.

In a 2020 paper written by Symth et al. in assessing spinosaurine specimens from the Kem Kem Group suggested the Brazilian spinosaurine Oxalaia to be a potential junior synonym of Spinosaurus aegyptiacus. This was based on looking at the specimens assigned to Oxalaia, and the supposed autapomorphies of this taxon to be insignificant and fall within the hypodigm of Spinosaurus aegyptiacus. If supported by future studies, this would imply Spinosaurus aegyptiacus had a wider distribution and supports the faunal exchange between South America and Africa during this time. Additionally, the study further indicates synonymy between Spinosaurus and Sigilmassasaurus.

Description

Size 
Since its discovery, Spinosaurus has been a contender for the longest and largest theropod dinosaur.

François Therrien and Donald Henderson, in a 2007 paper using scaling based on skull length, challenged previous estimates of the size of Spinosaurus, finding the length too great and the weight too small. The lower estimates for Spinosaurus would imply that the animal was shorter and lighter than Carcharodontosaurus and Giganotosaurus.

They argued that the 2D graphical reconstruction of the aquatic hypothesis by Ibrahim and his colleagues in 2020 overestimated the presacral column length by 10%, ribcage depth by 25%, and forelimb length by 30% over dimensions based on CT-scanned fossils; these proportional overestimates shift the center of mass anteriorly when translated to a flesh model, and thus the estimate from Ibrahim and his colleagues cannot be considered a reliable body size estimate.

Skull

Its skull had a narrow snout filled with straight conical teeth that lacked serrations. There were six or seven teeth on each side of the very front of the upper jaw, in the premaxillae, and another twelve in both maxillae behind them. The second and third teeth on each side were noticeably larger than the rest of the teeth in the premaxilla, creating a space between them and the large teeth in the front of the maxilla; large teeth in the lower jaw faced this space. The very tip of the snout holding those few large front teeth was expanded, and a small crest was present in front of the eyes. The Dal Sasso and colleagues skull length estimate is questioned because skull shapes can vary across spinosaurid species and because MSNM V4047 may not belong to Spinosaurus itself.

Postcranial skeleton

As a spinosaurid, Spinosaurus would have had a long, muscular neck, curved in a sigmoid, or S-shape. Its shoulders were prominent, and the forelimbs large and stocky, bearing three clawed digits on each hand. The first finger (or "thumb") would have been the largest. Spinosaurus had long phalanges (finger bones), and only somewhat recurved claws, suggesting that its hands were longer compared to those of other spinosaurids.

Very tall neural spines growing on the back vertebrae of Spinosaurus formed the basis of what is usually called the animal's "sail".  The lengths of the neural spines reached over 10 times the diameters of the centra (vertebral bodies) from which they extended. The neural spines were slightly longer front to back at the base than higher up, and were unlike the thin rods seen in the pelycosaur finbacks Edaphosaurus and Dimetrodon, contrasting also with the thicker spines in the iguanodontian Ouranosaurus.

Spinosaurus sails were unusual, although other dinosaurs, namely Ouranosaurus, which lived a few million years earlier in the same general region as Spinosaurus, and the South American sauropod Amargasaurus, might have developed similar structural adaptations of their vertebrae. The sail may be an analog of the sail of the Permian synapsid Dimetrodon, which lived before the dinosaurs even appeared, produced by convergent evolution.

The structure may also have been more hump-like than sail-like, as noted by Stromer in 1915 ("one might rather think of the existence of a large hump of fat [German: Fettbuckel], to which the [neural spines] gave internal support") and by Jack Bowman Bailey in 1997. In support of his "buffalo-back" hypothesis, Bailey argued that in Spinosaurus, Ouranosaurus, and other dinosaurs with long neural spines, the spines were relatively shorter and thicker than the spines of pelycosaurs (which were known to have sails); instead, the dinosaurs' neural spines were similar to the neural spines of extinct hump-backed mammals such as Megacerops and Bison latifrons. In 2014, Ibrahim and colleagues instead posited that the spines were covered tightly by skin, similar to a crested chameleon, given their compactness, sharp edges, and likely poor blood flow.

Spinosaurus had a significantly smaller pelvis (hip bone) than that of other giant theropods, with the surface area of the ilium (main body of the pelvis) half that of most members of the clade. The hind limbs were short, at just over 25 percent of the total body length, with the tibia (calf bone) being longer than the femur (thigh bone). Unlike in other theropods, the hallux (or fourth toe) of Spinosaurus touched the ground, and the phalanges of the toe bones were unusually long and well-built. At their ends were shallow claws that had flat bottoms. This type of foot morphology is also seen in shorebirds, indicating that Spinosaurus's feet evolved for walking across unstable substrate and that they may have been webbed.

From the caudal vertebrae of the tail projected significantly elongated, thin neural spines, akin to the condition observed in some other spinosaurids, though to a more extreme degree. Coupled with the also elongated chevron bones on the underside of the caudals, this resulted in a deep and narrow tail with a paddle or fin-like shape, comparable to the tails of newts and crocodilians.

Classification

Spinosaurus gives its name to the dinosaur family Spinosauridae, which includes two subfamilies: Baryonychinae and Spinosaurinae. Baryonychinae includes Baryonyx from southern England and Suchomimus from Niger in central Africa. Spinosaurinae includes Spinosaurus, Sigilmassasaurus, Oxalaia, Siamosaurus, Ichthyovenator, Irritator from Brazil, and Angaturama (which may be synonymous with Irritator) from Brazil. The spinosaurines share unserrated straight teeth that are widely spaced (e.g., 12 on one side of the maxilla), as opposed to the baryonychines, which have serrated curved teeth that are numerous (e.g., 30 on one side of the maxilla).

An analysis of Spinosauridae by Arden and colleagues (2018) named the clade Spinosaurini and defined it as all spinosaurids closer to Spinosaurus aegyptiacus than to Irritator challengeri or Oxalaia quilombensis; it also found Siamosaurus suteethorni and Icthyovenator laosensis to be members of Spinosaurinae.

Phylogeny 
The subfamily Spinosaurinae was named by Sereno in 1998, and defined by Holtz and colleagues (2004) as all taxa closer to Spinosaurus aegyptiacus than to Baryonyx walkeri. The subfamily Baryonychinae was named by Charig & Milner in 1986. They erected both the subfamily and the family Baryonychidae for the newly discovered Baryonyx, before it was referred to Spinosauridae. Their subfamily was defined by Holtz and colleagues in 2004, as the complementary clade of all taxa closer to Baryonyx walkeri than to Spinosaurus aegyptiacus. Examinations by Marcos Sales, Cesar Schultz, and colleagues (2017) indicate that the South American spinosaurids Angaturama, Irritator, and Oxalaia were intermediate between Baronychinae and Spinosaurinae based on their craniodental features and cladistic analysis. This indicates that Baryonychinae may in fact be non-monophyletic. Their cladogram can be seen below.
 

The cladogram below depicts the findings of Arden and colleagues (2018):

Paleobiology

Function of neural spines

The function of the dinosaur's sail or hump is uncertain; scientists have proposed several hypotheses including heat regulation and display. In addition, such a prominent feature on its back could make it appear even larger than it was, intimidating other animals.

The structure may have been used for thermoregulation.  If the structure contained abundant blood vessels, the animal could have used the sail's large surface area to absorb heat. This would imply that the animal was only partly warm-blooded at best and lived in climates where night-time temperatures were cool or low and the sky usually not cloudy. It is also possible that the structure was used to radiate excess heat from the body, rather than to collect it. Large animals, due to the relatively small ratio of surface area of their body compared to the overall volume (Haldane's principle), face far greater problems of dissipating excess heat at higher temperatures than gaining it at lower. Sails of large dinosaurs added considerably to the skin area of their bodies, with minimum increase of volume. Furthermore, if the sail was turned away from the sun, or positioned at a 90 degree angle towards a cooling wind, the animal would quite effectively cool itself in the warm climate of Cretaceous Africa.  However, Bailey (1997) was of the opinion that a sail could have absorbed more heat than it radiated. Bailey proposed instead that Spinosaurus and other dinosaurs with long neural spines had fatty humps on their backs for energy storage, insulation, and shielding from heat.

Many elaborate body structures of modern-day animals serve to attract members of the opposite sex during mating. It is possible that the sail of Spinosaurus was used for courtship, in a way similar to a peacock's tail. Stromer speculated that the size of the neural spines may have differed between males and females.

Gimsa and colleagues (2015) suggest that the dorsal sail of Spinosaurus was analogous to the dorsal fins of sailfish and served a hydrodynamic purpose. Gimsa and others point out that more basal, long-legged spinosaurids had otherwise round or crescent-shaped dorsal sails, whereas in Spinosaurus, the dorsal neural spines formed a shape that was roughly rectangular, similar in shape to the dorsal fins of sailfish. They therefore argue that Spinosaurus used its dorsal neural sail in the same manner as sailfish, and that it also employed its long narrow tail to stun prey like a modern thresher shark. Sailfish employ their dorsal fins for herding schools of fish into a "bait ball" where they cooperate to trap the fish into a certain area where the sailfish can snatch the fish with their bills.
The sail could have possibly reduced yaw rotation by counteracting the lateral force in the direction opposite to the slash as suggested by Gimsa and colleagues (2015). They specifically wrote:
 
Spinosaurus anatomy exhibits another feature that may have a modern analogy: its long tail resembled that of the thresher shark, employed to slap the water to herd and stun shoals of fish before devouring them (Oliver and colleagues, 2013).
The strategies that sailfish and thresher sharks employ against shoaling fish are more effective when the shoal is first concentrated into a ‘bait ball’ (Helfman, Collette & Facey, 1997; Oliver and colleagues, 2013; Domenici and colleagues, 2014). Since this is difficult for individual predators to achieve, they cooperate in this effort. When herding a shoal of fish or squid, sailfish also raise their sails to make themselves appear larger. When they slash or wipe their bills through shoaling fish by turning their heads, their dorsal sail and fins are outstretched to stabilize their bodies hydrodynamically (Lauder & Drucker, 2004). Domenici and colleagues (2014) postulate that these fin extensions enhance the accuracy of tapping and slashing. The sail can reduce yaw rotation by counteracting the lateral force in the direction opposite to the slash. This means that prey is less likely to recognize the massive trunk as being part of an approaching predator (Marras and colleagues, 2015; Webb & Weihs 2015).

Spinosaurus exhibited the anatomical features required to combine all three hunting strategies: a sail for herding prey more efficiently, as well as flexible tail and neck to slap the water for stunning, injuring or killing prey. The submerged dorsal sail would have provided a strong centreboard-like counterforce for powerful sidewards movements of the strong neck and long tail, as performed by sailfish (Domenici and colleagues, 2014) or thresher sharks (Oliver and colleagues, 2013). While smaller dorsal sails or fins make the dorsal water volume better accessible for slashing, it can be speculated that their smaller stabilization effect makes lateral slashing less efficient (e.g. for thresher sharks). Forming a hydrodynamic fulcrum and hydrodynamically stabilizing the trunk along the dorsoventral axis, Spinosaurus’ sail would also have compensated for the inertia of the lateral neck by tail movements and vice versa not only for predation but also for accelerated swimming. This behaviour might also have been one reason for Spinosaurus’ muscular chest and neck reported by Ibrahim and colleagues (2014).

Diet and feeding

It is unclear whether Spinosaurus was primarily a terrestrial predator or a piscivore, as indicated by its elongated jaws, conical teeth and raised nostrils. The hypothesis of spinosaurs as specialized fish eaters has been suggested before by A. J. Charig and A. C. Milner for Baryonyx. They base this on the anatomical similarity with crocodilians and the presence of digestive acid-etched fish scales in the rib cage of the type specimen. Large fish are known from the faunas containing other spinosaurids, including the Mawsonia, in the mid-Cretaceous of northern Africa and Brazil. Direct evidence for spinosaur diet comes from related European and South American taxa. Baryonyx was found with fish scales and bones from juvenile Iguanodon in its stomach, while a tooth embedded in a South American pterosaur bone suggests that spinosaurs occasionally preyed on pterosaurs, but Spinosaurus was likely to have been a generalized and opportunistic predator, possibly a Cretaceous equivalent of large grizzly bears, being biased toward fishing, though it undoubtedly scavenged and took many kinds of small or medium-sized prey.

In 2009, Dal Sasso and colleagues. reported the results of X-ray computed tomography of the MSNM V4047 snout. As the foramina on the outside all communicated with a space on the inside of the snout, the authors speculated that Spinosaurus had pressure receptors inside the space that allowed it to hold its snout at the surface of the water to detect swimming prey species without seeing them. A 2013 study by Andrew R. Cuff and Emily J. Rayfield concluded that bio-mechanical data suggests that Spinosaurus was not an obligate piscivore and that its diet was more closely associated with each individual's size. The characteristic rostral morphology of Spinosaurus allowed its jaws to resist bending in the vertical direction, but its jaws were poorly adapted with respect to resisting lateral bending compared to other members of this group (Baryonyx) and modern alligators. This suggests that Spinosaurus preyed more regularly on fish than it did on land animals, although considered predators of the former too. In 2022, Sakamoto estimated that Spinosaurus had an anterior bite force of 4,829 newtons and a posterior bite force of 11,936 newtons. Based on this estimate, he asserted that the jaws of Spinosaurus are adapted for generating relatively faster shutting speeds with less muscle input force, indicating that the animal likely killed its prey with fast-snapping jaws rather than slow-crushing bites, a trait commonly observed in animals which have a semi-aquatic feeding habit.

Aquatic habits 
 
A 2010 isotope analysis by Romain Amiot and colleagues found that oxygen isotope ratios of spinosaurid teeth, including teeth of Spinosaurus, indicate semiaquatic lifestyles. Isotope ratios from tooth enamel and from other parts of Spinosaurus (found in Morocco and Tunisia) and of other predators from the same area such as Carcharodontosaurus were compared with isotopic compositions from contemporaneous theropods, turtles, and crocodilians. The study found that Spinosaurus teeth from five of six sampled localities had oxygen isotope ratios closer to those of turtles and crocodilians when compared with other theropod teeth from the same localities. The authors postulated that Spinosaurus switched between terrestrial and aquatic habitats to compete for food with large crocodilians and other large theropods respectively. A 2018 study by Donald Henderson, however, refutes the claim that Spinosaurus was semiaquatic. By studying the buoyancy in lungs of crocodilians and comparing it to the lung placement in Spinosaurus, it was discovered that Spinosaurus could not sink or dive below the water surface. It was also capable of keeping its entire head above the water surface while floating, much like other non-aquatic theropods. Furthermore, the study found that Spinosaurus had to continually paddle its hind legs to prevent itself from tipping over onto its side, something that extant semiaquatic animals do not need to perform. Henderson therefore theorized that Spinosaurus probably did not hunt completely submerged in water as previously hypothesized, but instead would have spent much of its time on land or in shallow water.

Recent studies of the tail vertebrae of Spinosaurus refute Henderson's proposal that Spinosaurus mainly inhabited areas of land near and in shallow water and was too buoyant to submerge. Studies of the tail, thanks to specimens recovered and analyzed by Ibrahim, Pierce, Lauder, and Sereno and colleagues in 2018 indicate that Spinosaurus had a keeled tail that was well adapted to propelling the animal through water. The elongated neural spines and chevrons, which run to the end of the tail on both dorsal and ventral sides, indicate that Spinosaurus was able to swim in a similar manner to modern crocodilians. Through experimentation by Lauder and Pierce, the tail of Spinosaurus was found to have eight times as much forward thrust as the tails of terrestrial theropods like Coelophysis and Allosaurus, as well as being twice as efficient at achieving forward thrust. The discovery indicates that Spinosaurus may have had a lifestyle comparable to modern alligators and crocodiles, remaining in water for long periods of time while hunting.

Dr David Hone and Dr Thomas Holtz published a paper in January 2021 in which they argue that the anatomy of Spinosaurus is more consistent with a shoreline generalist lifestyle rather than an active aquatic pursuit predator as suggested by Ibrahim. They highlight the positioning of the nostrils and orbits as one reason why a crocodile-like lifestyle is unlikely: they are ventrally positioned in such a way that the whole head would have to be lifted inefficiently out of the water in order to breathe. Additionally, they argue that the general body shape of Spinosaurus is poorly adapted for this lifestyle, drawing on the amount of water drag and aquatic instability from the sail, as well as the rigid trunk and seemingly scarcely-muscled tail. Animals like crocodilians require a flexible body in order to move through the water and make sharp turns when chasing prey, and this is directly contradicted by Hone and Holtz's findings.

A 2022 study by Fabbri et al., made comparisons of Spinosaurus bone structure and compared it to that of Baryonyx and Suchomimus. The study revealed that Spinosaurus and Baryonyx had dense bones, which allowed them to dive and pursue prey underwater. Compared to these, Suchomimus had more hollow bones, suggesting it preferred to hunt in shallow water. These findings also suggest that various spinosaurid genera were more ecologically disparate than previously believed, as some were better suited to hunting in subaqueous environments than other, closely related genera.

In the same year, contradicting the study by Fabbri and colleagues, Sereno and his colleagues suggested that Spinosaurus  was wholly bipedal on land and an unstable, slow moving surface swimmer in deep water. Their results, taken from reconstructing a CT model of the skeleton, and then adding internal air and muscles. Their results, coupled with fossils from Spinosaurus that showed it also lived further inland along rivers and lakes, suggest it was a semi-aquatic, ambush piscivore that preferred waterside environments both along the coasts and further inland along rivers and lakes. Simultaneously, they suggested that the large tail fin was probably utilized more for display than swimming, as tails in living animals have the same function when they possess comparably tall neural spines.

Locomotion and posture
 
Although traditionally depicted in the scientific community as a biped, Spinosaurus was often depicted in the mid-20th century as an obligate quadruped akin to Dimetrodon. Starting in the mid-1970s, it was hypothesised Spinosaurus was at least an occasional quadruped, bolstered by the discovery of Baryonyx, a relative with robust arms. Because of the mass of the hypothesized fatty dorsal humps of Spinosaurus, Bailey (1997) was open to the possibility of a quadrupedal posture, leading to new restorations of it as such. Theropods, including spinosaurids, could not pronate their hands (rotate the forearm so the palm faced the ground), but a resting position on the side of the hand was possible, as shown by fossil prints from an Early Jurassic theropod. The hypothesis that Spinosaurus had a typical quadrupedal gait since fell out of favour, however it was still believed that spinosaurids may have crouched in a quadrupedal posture, due to biological and physiological constraints.

 
The possibility of a quadrupedal Spinosaurus was revived by a 2014 paper by Ibrahim and colleagues that described new material of the animal. The paper found that the hind limbs of Spinosaurus were much shorter than previously believed, and that its center of mass was located in the midpoint of the trunk region, as opposed to near the hip as in typical bipedal theropods. It was therefore proposed that Spinosaurus was poorly adapted for bipedal terrestrial locomotion, and must have been an obligate quadruped on land. The reconstruction used in the study was an extrapolation based on different sized individuals, scaled to what were assumed to be the correct proportions. Paleontologist John Hutchinson of the Royal Veterinary College of the University of London has expressed scepticism to the new reconstruction, and cautioned that using different specimens can result in inaccurate chimaeras. Scott Hartman also expressed criticism because he believed the legs and the pelvis were inaccurately scaled (27% too short) and didn't match the published lengths. However, Mark Witton expressed agreement with the proportions reported in the paper. In their 2015 re-description of Sigilmassasaurus, Evers and colleagues argued that Sigilmassasaurus was in fact a distinct genus from Spinosaurus, and therefore doubted whether the material assigned to Spinosaurus by Ibrahim et al. should be assigned to Spinosaurus or Sigilmassasaurus. In 2018, an analysis by Henderson found that Spinosaurus probably was competent at bipedal terrestrial locomotion; the centre of mass was instead found to be close to the hips, allowing Spinosaurus to stand upright like other bipedal theropods.

Ontogeny
An ungual phalanx measuring  belonging to a very young juvenile Spinosaurus indicates that the theropod developed its semiaquatic adaptations at a very young age or at birth and maintained them throughout its life.

Paleoenvironment 

The environment inhabited by Spinosaurus is only partially understood, and covers a great deal of what is now northern Africa. The region of Africa Spinosaurus is preserved in dates from 112 to 93.5 million years ago, although a potential specimen has been found in Campanian deposits. A 1996 study concluded from Moroccan fossils that Spinosaurus, Carcharodontosaurus, and Deltadromeus "ranged across north Africa during the late Cretaceous (Cenomanian)." Those Spinosaurus that lived in the Bahariya Formation of what is now Egypt may have contended with shoreline conditions on tidal flats and channels, living in mangrove forests alongside similarly large dinosaurian predators Bahariasaurus and Carcharodontosaurus, the titanosaur sauropods Paralititan and Aegyptosaurus, crocodylomorphs, bony and cartilaginous fish, turtles, lizards, and plesiosaurs. In the dry season it might have resorted to preying on pterosaurs. Differences in head shape and body size among the large North African theropods may have been enough to allow niche partitioning as seen among the many different predator species found today in the African savanna (Farlow & Pianka, 2002).

In popular culture 

Spinosaurus appeared in the 2001 film Jurassic Park III, replacing Tyrannosaurus as the main antagonist. The film's consulting paleontologist John R. Horner was quoted as saying, "If we base the ferocious factor on the length of the animal, there was nothing that ever lived on this planet that could match this creature [Spinosaurus]. Also my hypothesis is that T-rex was actually a scavenger rather than a killer. Spinosaurus was really the predatory animal." He has since retracted the statement about T. rex being a scavenger. In the film, Spinosaurus was portrayed as larger and more powerful than Tyrannosaurus: in a scene depicting a battle between the two resurrected predators, Spinosaurus emerges victorious by snapping the Tyrannosaurus''' neck. In the fourth film, Jurassic World, there is a nod to this fight where the T. rex smashes through the skeleton of a Spinosaurus in the climactic fight near the end of the film. The same Spinosaurus from the third film returns in the fourth season of Jurassic World: Camp Cretaceous.Spinosaurus has long been depicted in popular books about dinosaurs, although only recently has there been enough information about spinosaurids for an accurate depiction. After an influential 1955 skeletal reconstruction by Lapparent and Lavocat based on a 1936 diagram by Stromer, it has been treated as a generalized upright theropod, with a skull similar to that of other large theropods and a sail on its back, even having four-fingered hands.

In addition to films, action figures, video games, and books, Spinosaurus has been depicted on postage stamps from countries such as Angola, The Gambia, and Tanzania.

See alsoHalszkaraptorKoreaceratopsLiaoningosaurusLurdusaurus References 

 Further reading 
 Glut, D.F. "In search of Spinosaurus."  In: Jurassic classics: a collection of saurian essays and Mesozoic musings, pp. 77–85. Jefferson, NC: McFarland, 2001. .
 Nothdurft, W.; and Smith, J. The Lost Dinosaurs of Egypt. New York: Random House, 2002. .
A Tribute to Ernst Stromer: Hundred Years of the Discovery of Spinosaurus aegyptiacus: Saubhik Ghosh

 External links 

"A Strange Dinosaur May Have Swum the Rivers of Africa". Spinosaurus profile by Kenneth Chang at NY Times, April 29, 2020 
 Hartman, Scott. Spinosaur Comparison. SkeletalDrawing.com, 2006.
 Mortimer, Mickey. Spinosaurus Stromer, 1915. (List of specimens from The Theropod Database.)
 Natural History Museum. Dino Directory: Spinosaurus.
 Prendergast, John. Dinosaurs Lost and Found. The Pennsylvania Gazette, the Alumni Magazine of the University of Pennsylvania'', July/Aug 2001.

Spinosaurids
Early Cretaceous dinosaurs of Africa
Late Cretaceous dinosaurs of Africa
Albian genus first appearances
Cenomanian genus extinctions
Fossils of Algeria
Fossils of Egypt
Bahariya Formation
Fossils of Morocco
Fossils of Tunisia
Fossil taxa described in 1915
Taxa named by Ernst Stromer
Articles containing video clips
Semiaquatic animals
1910s neologisms